HMS Pincher was a coal-fired  destroyer of the Royal Navy built by William Denny and Brothers and launched on 15 March 1910.

Construction and design
Pincher was one of sixteen s ordered under the 1908–1909 construction programme for the Royal Navy, and the only one of the class from the Scottish shipbuilder William Denny and Brothers . The Beagles were intended as a smaller and slower follow on to the previous , which would be affordable enough to be built in large numbers. The use of coal as a fuel was ordered to reduce costs. The Beagles were not built to a standard design, with detailed design being left to the builders of individual ships in accordance with a loose specification.

Displacement was  normal.

The class had a gun armament of one BL 4 inch naval gun Mk VIII on the ships forecastle, and three QF 12-pounder 12 cwt guns. Torpedo armament consisted of two  torpedo tubes, with one between the ship's funnels and the aft gun, and one right aft at the stern of the ship. Two spare torpedoes were carried. The ships had a crew of 96 officers and men.

Pincher was laid down on 20 May 1909 at Denny's Dumbarton shipyard as Yard number 878 was launched on 15 March 1910, and completed on 2 September 1910.

Service history
The Beagles joined the 1st and 2nd Destroyer Flotillas as they commissioned, but in 1912, a reorganisation of the Home Fleet resulted in the Beagles forming the 3rd Destroyer Flotilla. Pincher remained part of the 3rd Flotilla in March 1913.  In October 1913, the Beagles, including Pincher, were moved to the Mediterranean as the newly formed 5th Destroyer Flotilla.

Pincher was still part of the 5th Flotilla at the outbreak of the First World War. On the eve of war, the Mediterranean Fleet was deployed to find the German battlecruiser  and cruiser .

In November 1914, as a response to a shortage of destroyers in home waters, Pincher was one of eight Beagle-class destroyers recalled to Britain, reaching Plymouth on 29 November, and being used to operate from Portsmouth, patrolling the routes used by cross-Channel transports. It had been planned to use the Beagles to equip a new Tenth Destroyer Flotilla based at Harwich, but the need for escorts for transports in the Channel led to these plans being abandoned, and the ships remained at Portsmouth.

On 26 March 1915, following the failure of attempts to force the Dardanelles had failed, these eight Beagles were ordered to rejoin the 5th Destroyer Flotilla Mudros for operations in support of the Dardanelles Campaign. During the initial landings at ANZAC Cove and at Cape Helles, Pincher joined several other destroyers in minesweeping operations in the Dardanelles straits to allow  Allied battleships to bombard Turkish positions. Despite these patrols, the Turkish destroyer  managed to sneak past Beagle and Bulldog on the northern side of the straits and torpedoed and sunk Goliath before successfully escaping. From March 1916, Pincher operated in the Aegean, patrolling the Dodecanese, Sporades and Cyclades and the Turkish coast.

Pincher remained with the 5th Flotilla until December 1917, but by 2 January 1918, she had returned to British waters, and was repairing at Pembroke Dock before joining the 2nd Destroyer Flotilla, operating with the Northern Division of the Coast of Ireland Station and based at Buncrana in the north of Ireland. By June 1918, Pincher had transferred to the 4th Destroyer Flotilla at Devonport.

Errors in navigation due to fog compounded the error and Pincher struck the reef at high speed. The impact tore open her hull and she sank at 03:33 hours. After the accident, her commander — Lieutenant Patrick W.R. Weir — was subjected to a court-martial, at which he was sentenced to be reprimanded for steering an unsafe course.

Notes

References
 Archibald, E.H.H.; Ray Woodward (ill.) (1971). The Metal Fighting Ship in the Royal Navy 1860-1970. New York: Arco Publishing Co.. .

External links
 

 

1910 ships
Ships built on the River Clyde
Beagle-class destroyers
World War I destroyers of the United Kingdom
World War I shipwrecks in the Atlantic Ocean
Cornish shipwrecks
Maritime incidents in 1918